"Cemetery" is a song performed by Australian singer-songwriter Missy Higgins. Higgins premiered "Cemetery" at "A Weekend in the Gardens" on 19 November 2017, and released on 13 April 2018 as the second and final single from her fifth studio album, Solastalgia. The song peaked at number 49 on the ARIA Digital Singles Chart.

Upon release, Higgins explained "I've just always been really adventurous and a bit of an explorer and for some reason I got into the habit of finding cemeteries and jumping the fence and going for a walk. There was something really peaceful about it because there was no one else in there with me apart from dead people." The song is combination of this habit with a tumultuous past relationship. Higgins said "It almost felt like we couldn't ever survive as a couple because it was too uncertain and dangerous and exciting and explosive. It was one of those things that kind of felt like you were playing with death while in that relationship."

Video 
The video for "Cemetery" was directed by Natasha Pincus and released on 26 April 2018.

Reception 
Kevin Humphreys from Alternative Press said "'Cemetery' is a full on pop tune with a big chorus that is perfect for any dance floor." Mushroom Records said "'Cemetery' is an infectious and uptempo single despite its downbeat title."

Charts

References 
 

2017 songs
2018 singles
Missy Higgins songs
Eleven: A Music Company singles
Songs written by Missy Higgins
Songs written by Steph Jones